Rade may refer to:

 E De people, a people group in Southeast Asia also called "Rhade" or "Rade"
 places in Lower-Saxony, Germany:
 Rade, Neu Wulmstorf, a village in the district of Harburg
 places in Schleswig-Holstein, Germany:
 Rade, Steinburg, a municipality in the district of Steinburg
 Rade bei Hohenwestedt, a municipality in the district of Rendsburg-Eckernförde
 Rade bei Rendsburg, a municipality in the district of Rendsburg-Eckernförde
 places in Saxony-Anhalt, Germany:
 Rade, Saxony-Anhalt
 RADE - Rapid Application Development Environment - term used to denote software development process used by collaborating computer code writers.

Personal name
 Rade is a shortened Serbo-Croatian form of both Radovan and Radoslav:
 Rade, a Swiss hip hop artist, former member of Sens Unik
 Rade Bogdanović (1970-), a former Serbian football player.
 Rade Šerbedžija, Croatian actor